The enzyme xylonate dehydratase catalyzes the chemical reaction:

D-xylonate  2-dehydro-3-deoxy-D-xylonate + H2O 

This enzyme belongs to the family of lyases, specifically the hydro-lyases, which cleave carbon-oxygen bonds.  The systematic name of this enzyme class is D-xylonate hydro-lyase (2-dehydro-3-deoxy-D-xylonate-forming). Other names in common use include D-xylo-aldonate dehydratase, D-xylonate dehydratase, and D-xylonate hydro-lyase.  This enzyme participates in pentose and glucuronate interconversions.

References

 
 

EC 4.2.1
Enzymes of unknown structure